Uttleya is a genus of sea snails, marine gastropod mollusks in the family Muricidae, the murex snails or rock snails.

Species 

Species within the genus Uttleya include:

 Uttleya ahiparana (Powell, 1927)
 Uttleya arcana Marwick, 1934
 Uttleya marwicki Powell, 1952
 Uttleya williamsi Powell, 1952

References 

 
Ergalataxinae